Morning Eagle Falls is a waterfall located on Cataract Creek in Glacier National Park, Montana, US. The waterfall is on the southeast slopes of Mount Gould in the Many Glacier region of the park.

References

Landforms of Glacier County, Montana
Landforms of Glacier National Park (U.S.)
Waterfalls of Glacier National Park (U.S.)